Tiv (or Tiiv) are a Tivoid ethnic group. They constitute approximately 2.4% of Nigeria's total population, and number over 5 million individuals throughout Nigeria and Cameroon.
The Tiv language is spoken by about 5 million people in Nigeria with a few speakers in Cameroon. Most of the language's Nigerian speakers are found in Benue, Taraba, Nasarawa, Plateau, Cross rivers, Adamawa, Kaduna, and Abuja States. The language is a branch of Benue–Congo and ultimately of the Niger–Congo phylum. In pre-colonial times, the Fulani ethnic group referred to the Tiv as "Munchi" (also sometimes written Munshi e.g. Duggan 1932 and Ako 1981), a term not accepted by Tiv people. They depend on agricultural produce for commerce and sustenance.

History

The Tiv believe they emerged into their present location from the southeast. It is claimed that the Tiv wandered through southern, south-central and west-central Africa before arriving at the savannah lands of West African Sudan via the River Congo and Cameroon Mountains and settled at Swemkaragbe the region adjoining Cameron and Nigeria in the beginning of 1500 CE."Coming down," as they put it, was in batches, some moved southward across Obudu mountains others moved northward spreading over Mdema and Waka district, while others moved into core benue valley present day core Central Nigeria. These dispersions took place in the early 1500 CE to 1600 CE, over time as social interactions began and new migrants came into Nigeria. The Tiv people were a free people without a king; hence every clan or kindred was administered by the eldest man called "Orya" they were amongst the first inhabitants of the Benue Valley according to Mark Cartwright record of Bantu migration before other tribes finally migrated to join them, Due to their peaceful disposition and dispersed nature of living, with no Central government nor king, they posed no threat to new migrants to the region who cohabited with them until the coming of the Europeans. The Europeans first contact with Tiv was in the 18th century. Note that the time of encounter with the European does not means their time of migration, their late recognition was due to the lack of kingship which became a big disadvantage to Tiv in Nigeria because the colonial masters prefer working with kings, so when the Tiv were found on the banks of the Benue River and were discovered to be distinct from other ethnic minorities and were the major occupants of the Benue Valley. That was when kinship was later introduced to Tiv people by the European in the 1940s Benue. In 1879 their occupation of the riverbanks was about the same as in 1950. British forces entered Tivland from the east in 1906, when there was tension between Tiv and other minorities within the Benue valley. The Tiv said in 1950 that they had defeated this British force, then later invited the British in for negotiations. The southern area was penetrated from the south; what southern Tiv refer to as "the eruption" of the British there occurred in 1911.

The Tiv came into contact with European culture during the colonial period. During November 1907 to spring 1908, an expedition of the Southern Nigeria Regiment led by Lieutenant-Colonel Hugh Trenchard came into contact with the Tiv. Trenchard brought gifts for the tribal chiefs. Subsequently, roads were built and trade links established between Europeans and the Tiv. But before construction of roads began, a missionary named Mary Slessor went throughout the region seeing to the people's needs.

Social and political organization 
Most Tiv have a highly developed sense of genealogy, with descent being reckoned patrilineally. Ancestry is traced to an ancient individual named Tiv, who had two sons; all Tiv consider themselves a member either of Ichongo (descendants of son Chongo) or of Ipusu (descendants of son Pusu). Ichongo and Ipusu are each divided into several major branches, which in turn are divided into smaller branches. The smallest branch, or minimal lineage, is the ipaven. Members of an ipaven tend to live together, the local kin-based community being called the "tar". This form of social organisation, called a segmentary lineage, is seen in various parts of the world, but it is particularly well known from African societies (Middleton and Tait 1958). The Tiv are the best-known example in West Africa of a society of segmentary lineage, as documented by Laura Bohannan (1952) and by Paul and Laura Bohannan (1953); in East Africa, the best-known example is the Nuer, documented by E.E. Evans-Pritchard (1940).

The Tiv had no administrative divisions and no chiefs nor councils. Leadership was based on age, influence and affluence. The leaders' functions were to furnish safe conduct, arbitrate disputes within their lineages, sit on moots and lead their people in all external and internal affairs.

These socio-political arrangements caused great frustration to British attempts to incorporate the population into Colonial Nigeria and establish an administration on the lower Benue. The strategy of indirect rule, which the British felt to be highly successful in regards to ruling over the Hausa and Fulani populations in Northern Nigeria, was ineffective in a segmentary society like the Tiv (Dorward 1969). Colonial officers tried various approaches to administration, such as putting the Tiv under the control of the nearby Jukun, and trying to exert control through the councils of elders ("Jir Tamen"); these met with little success. The colonial administration in 1934 categorised the Tiv into Clans, Kindreds, and Family Groups. The British appointed native heads of these divisions as well.

Members of the Tiv group are found in many areas across the globe, such as the United States and United Kingdom. In these countries, they hold unions, known as MUT (Mzough U Tiv, or Mutual Union of Tiv in English), where members can assemble and discuss issues concerning their people across the world, but especially back in Nigeria. The arm of the MUT serving the United States of America is known as MUTA (Mzough U Tiv ken Amerika, or Mutual Union of the Tiv in America), for instance.

Society and culture

National attire (A'nger)
The Tiv national attire is the black-and-white-striped anger. When the Tiv people arrived at their current location several centuries earlier, they discovered that the zebra they used to hunt for meat and skin, used for ceremonial attire, was not native to the area. When they acquired the skill of the loom, they decided to honor their heritage by weaving a cloth with black-and-white stripes, reminiscent of the zebra skin; this would then be made the preferred attire. Initially, it was a simple cloth to be draped around the torso. Nowadays, it is made into elaborate robes, such as those worn by the traditional rulers and elders – from the Tor Tiv downwards.

The black-and-white color of the necklaces worn by the traditional rulers has been chosen to match the robes.

Other Tiv cultural clothes are 
Ivvavtyo, Lishi, Gbev-whaa, Godo, Tugudu, Chado, Deremen, Gbagir.

Music and Entertainment 
Locally made musical instruments were traditionally used for political, ceremonial communication and entertainment. The key instruments follow.

Kakaki
The Kakaki is a royal trumpet used in many West African groups in Nigeria, Niger, Chad and Burkina Faso. This is an instrument used to convey special messages to the people of the community, such as the birth of the child of the King, his naming ceremony, the crowning of a new king, or to gather people together during the marriage ceremony of the king and the king's son's marriage ceremony. This instrument was used to convey all the messages to the people to assemble at the square for the ceremony. When there is an enemy attack on the community, a warning sound of the Kakaki is blown to alert those who can defend the society and every citizen to be alert.

Ilyu
A light wooden instrument, it was used to pass messages to the people of the village, probably for the invitation of the people for a particular meeting of the elders at the king's palace or for the people to gather at the market square for a message from or by the king. Up until today, it is the main instrument for the celebration of newlyweds (marriage reception ceremony or Kwase-kuhan).

Indyer
A heavy wooden instrument carved out of mahogany trunk through some mysterious way; myth has it that a chosen carver turns into a worm to create the large hollow in the cut trunk, leaving only a small opening (like in a medical operation). This belief is perhaps due to the fact that the carvers are reluctant to explain the technique employed for such artistic finesse. The Indyer, believed to be connected with high magico-spiritual potency, is not played for secular purposes except for special occasions as sanctioned by the elders. It is used to communicate the death of an important personality in the community or to communicate a serious happening in the community, like a call to war.

Akya
It is used together with Agbande (drums) combined with Ageda at festivals to pass a message across to the people for a call for the display of culture.

Adiguve
It is an instrument like a violin, used for music and dances in conjunction with Agbande (Agbande) at festivals and dance occasions, sometimes to announce the death of a leader or an elder of the community. During this period it is played sorrowfully for the mourning of the dead. It is mostly played at funerals.

Gbande
Agbande (plural) are a set of crafted wooden musical instruments used to complement agbande at festivals. They are particularly large and are played by the young men of the community. Special drum beats communicate special messages and music for the festivals to come and during the festivals, for instance, royal occasions such as the coronation and funeral.

Ortindin (Ortyom) – Messenger
Usually, he is chosen by the elders of the community to do errands for the elders and the leader of the community. He is sent out to the heads of the neighbouring families for a crucial meeting at the head of all the leaders of the community.

Kolugh ku Bua – Cow Horn
This is an instrument made out of cow horns. There are farmers' associations that use this instrument when they have a job to do; for instance, when they are invited to make ridges on a piece of land, the Public Relations Officer (PRO) of the association will use this medium to wake up the members for the work they have for that day.

Indigenous communication is not only vertical, from the rulers to the subjects, but is also horizontal. Individuals communicate with society through physical and metaphysical means. A farm owner, for example, may mount a charm conspicuously on his farm in order to stress private ownership and to scare off human intruders.

The fear of herbalists and witches influences social behaviour considerably.

Rainmakers communicate their power to disrupt events through various psychological means. Village sectors in Africa communicate mostly via the marketplace of ideas contributed by traditional religion, observances, divination, mythology, age-grades, the Chiefs courts, the elder's square, secret and title societies, the village market square, the village drum (gbande) men, indeed the total experiences of the villager in his environment.

Unlike the mass media, access to the native media is culturally determined and not economic. Only the selected group of young men or the elders can disseminate information generally. The young only disseminate general information about events and the social welfare of their communities using the media mentioned above.

The Tiv people of Benue state still practise some of this traditional system of communication, using the Kakais, Agbande, Indyer, Adiguve, Ilyu, etc. Nevertheless, the increase in the western world media is threatening the cultural communication system.

Many of the communities in Benue state still use these instruments to convey messages to the people of their community, and it is helping a great deal, since there is a language barrier between people with the introduction of the western world's means of communication, using a western language (English) to convey information.

Cuisine
The common Tiv food are mostly solid, cooked, pounded or prepared with hot water. They are mostly carbohydrates or byproducts of yams, cocoa-yam, cassava, beans, corn, etc. The Tiv are known to be the food basket of Nigeria.

Tiv have been identified by the British with the sesame seed as the British named it Beni-seed because it was the major cash crop exported to Europe and other colonies from the Benue valley.

Some common Tiv foods are ruam kumen (pounded yam), ruam nahan (turned food), akuto (sweet potato pottage), choko (dafa), akpukpa, etc.

soups
pocho, ager, genger, atyever, tur, vambe, igyo, agbende a ashwe, mngishim, ashwe, Atuur, vegetables, ijôv, aninge, furum, adenger, gbungu, angahar a ikyuna, gbande.

Tiv staples
roasted yams, 
ahuma, 
rice and beans (chingapa sha alev)

beverages
burukutu, 
ibyer

Snacks
peanuts and sesame (beni-seed), 
asondo (dried sweet potatoes), 
igbough ahi (roasted or boiled bambara nuts), 
mzembe (roasted pears), 
huu (roasted termites), 
alie and nyata, 
kuese (beans cake), N'gyata (groundnut paste)
 

 Drama 
The Tiv use a style of performing arts called Kwagh-hir. It's a storytelling method which uses carved masks and puppetry as a form of masquerade. Masquerade is used as a way for individuals of Tiv culture to express themselves. The Tiv use this style as a way to hide their identity and take the role of a spiritual being known as an adzov. The performers hide their identity, only to be revealed by their individual styles and at the end of the performance.

 Tiv Plays 
The Tiv used their plays as a way to tell traditional legends, recent events, and politics. A few popular plays in Tiv culture include:

 A Close Shave- Chris Kyoive
 Sons of Akpe- Boniface Leva

Demographics
 Benue state 
Tarkaa, Makurdi, Gwer East, Gwer west, Ukum, Logo, Konshisha, Gboko, Kwande, Vandeikya, Katsina Ala, Guma, Buruku, and Ushongo Local Government Areas.

Nassarawa state
Doma, Nasarawa, Lafia, Obi, Keana, and Awe Local Government Areas

Plateau state
Qua’an Pan and Shendam Local Government Areas

Taraba state
Bali, Donga, Ibi, Gassol, Takum, Gashaka, Kurmi and Wukari Local Government Areas

Cross River state
Yala, Bekwara, Obudu, and Obanliku Local Government Areas.

 Cameroon 
There are 1700 Tiv households with approximately 11,000 people at the south-western border of Cameroon, Manyu division, north east of Akwaya on the Nigerian border, and bordering the Iyom tribes of Cameroon. Their paramount ruler is Zaki Abaajul, who has the Tiv and Ulitsi as his subjects. The Cameronian Tiv are well educated and live in anglophone Cameroon as their ancestral land, while a few others live in the francophone region. They are mostly farmers but others work in the government.

Notable people
 Civil servants, politicians and activists

 Joseph Tarka, politician, human rights activist
 Barnabas Gemade, former PDP party chairman
 Aper Aku, first civilian governor of Benue state
 George Akume, former senate minority leader
 Iyorchia Ayu, former senate president
 Prof. Ignatius Akaayar Ayua, SAN, OFR, FNIALS, former Permanent Secretary Ministry of Justice, first professor of Law and Senior Advocate of Nigeria from Benue state, Legal luminary, Author
 Chaha Biam, former speaker house of representative
 Gabriel Suswam, politician former governor of Benue state and a serving senator
 Samuel Ortom, Current State Governor
 James Ayatse, Tor-Tiv v
 Daniel Saror, former minority leader
 Michael Aondoakaa, former attorney general of Nigeria
 Moses Adasu, politician, former Benue state governor
 A.I. Katsina Alu, former chief justice of Nigeria
 Iyorwuese Hagher, former senate deputy chief whip, minister and envoy
 Yima Sen, intellectual and radical political activist

Military and law enforcement
 Gideon Orkar, Nigerian Military officer.
 Victor Malu, former Chief of Army Staff
 Joseph Akahan, first Nigerian Chief of Army Staff
 Joseph Akaagerger, Former Governor of Katsina state
 John Mark Inienger, former ECOMOG commander
 Farida Waziri, former EFCC Chairperson
 John Kpera, Military governor of Anambra state.
 General Gabriel Kpamber, former ECOMOG commander

Athletes
 Terna Suswam, football player
 Dominic Iorfa Sr, football player
 Dominic Iorfa Jr football player
 Timothy Anjembe, football player
 David Tyavkase, football player
 Jeff Varem, NBA D-league player
 Terna Nande, American football player
 Apollo Crews, WWE wrestler
 Francisca Ordega, Nigerian national team soccer player
 Fanendo Adi
 Barnabas Imenger Jr., Nigerian super eagles striker
 Russel "Russwole" Orhii, World Champion Powerlifter

Culture
 Akiga Sai, autobiographer and historian
 Tay Iwar, singer, record producer and song-writer

See also

Tiv language
Ate-u-tiv

References

 Further reading 
Abraham, R.C. (1933) The Tiv People, Lagos.
Anifowose, R. (1982) Violence and Politics in Nigeria: The Tiv and the Yoruba Experience, New York: NOK.
Arinze, F. (1990) Africans and Christianity. Ejiofor, Rev. L. ed. Nsukka: Optimal Computer Solutions Ltd.
Ayoade, J.A. Agbaje, A.A. eds. (1989) African Traditional Political Thought and Institutions. Lagos: Centre for Black and African Arts and Civilization (CBAAC).
Bohannan, Paul J. & Laura (1953) The Tiv of Central Nigeria London: International African Institute, 1953.

David, T. ed. “Political Aspects of Tiv Social Organisation” in Tribe Without Rules. London: 1958.

Downes, R.M. The Tiv Tribe. Kaduna: Government Printer, 1933.
East, R. ed. Akiga's Story. London: 1965.
Ehusani, G.O. An Afro-Christian Vision “Ozovehe!.” Lanham, Maryland: University Press of America, 1991. 
Evans Pritchard, E.E. (1940). The Nuer. Oxford Univ. Press, New York.
Gbor, Capt. J.W.T. Mdugh U Tiv Man Mnyer Ve Ken Benue. Zaria: Gaskiya Publishing Corporation, 1978.
Hagher, I.H. The Tiv Kwagh-Hir. Ibadan: CBAAC, 1990.
Ikenga-Metuh, E. Comparative Studies of African Traditional Religion. Onitsha: Imico Publishers, 1987.
Ikima, O. ed. The Groundwork of Nigerian History. Ibadan: Heinemann Educational Books Nig Ltd. (for the Historical Society of Nigeria), 1980.
Jibo, M. Tiv Politics Since 1959. Katsina-Ala: Mandate International Limited, 1993.
Jibo, Mvendaga. Chieftaincy and Politics: The Tor Tiv in the Politics and Administration of Tivland. Frankfurt: Peter Lang AG, 2001. 325 pp. Europäische Hochschulschriften, Reihe 31: Politikwissenschaft Vol. 422  / US- pb.
Makar, T. A History of Political Change among the Tiv in the 19th and 20th Century. Enugu: Forth Dimension Publishing Co. Ltd., 1994.
Makar, T. Tiv People in Power Game in Nierian Politic Circa 1950–1983. Makurdi: Government Printer.
Mbiti, J.S. African Religious and Philosophy. London: Heinemann Press, 1970.
Middleton, J. & Tait, D. eds. (1958) Tribes Without Rulers: Studies in African Segmentary Systems, Routledge & Paul: London.
Rubingh, E. (1969) Sons of Tiv. Grand Rapids: Baker House.
Tseayo, J.I. Conflict and Incorporation in Nigeria: The Integration of the Tiv. Zaria: Gaskiya Corporation Limited, 1975.Vanguard Newspaper. Friday December 7, 2001.Vanguard Newspaper. Wednesday December 5, 2001.
Bohannan, P. Africa. Vol. XXIV, No.1, 1954.
Dorward, D.C. African Affairs. Vol. 68 No.273, London: 1969.
Ewelu, I.B. West African Journal of Philosophical Studies. Vol.2, December 1999.
Ikima, O. Journal of the Historical Society of Nigeria Vol. VII No. 1, 1973. 
 http://www.everyculture.com/Africa-Middle-East/Tiv-History-and-Cultural-Relations.html#ixzz4x6ZfwkpM

Unpublished works
Akever, E.T. The Effects of Yamishe in Tiv Traditional Marriage Culture. March 2001.
Akpagher, T. J. Israelite Monotheism in Comparison with the Monotheism of the Tiv Traditional Religion. June 1994.
Makar, T. A History of Political Change among the Tiv in the 19th and 20th Century. 1975. 
Ode, R. Developing Christian leadership in Contemporary Tiv Community. 1991. 
Sorkaa, A.P. The Contribution of Traditional Rulers to Rural Development in Nigeria up to the 21st Century''. Paper presented at the National Conference on the Nigerian State at A.B.U. Zaria, 1987.

 
Ethnic groups in Nigeria
Ethnic groups in Cameroon

es:Idioma tiv